Murray Henderson may refer to:

 Murray Henderson (footballer) (born 1980), Scottish football defender
 Murray Henderson (ice hockey) (1921–2013), Canadian ice hockey defenceman
 Murray Henderson (piper), bagpipe player
 Murray Henderson (rugby union) (born 1959), rugby union coach and former player from New Zealand
 M. R. Henderson (Murray Ross Henderson, 1899–1982), Scottish botanist